The Southwest Region is one of ten United States regions that currently send teams to the Little League World Series, the largest youth baseball competition in the world. The region's participation in the LLWS dates back to 1957, when it was known as the South Region. However, when the LLWS was expanded in 2001 from eight teams (four U.S. teams and four "International" teams from the rest of the world) to 16 teams (eight U.S. and eight International), the Southern Region was split into the Southeast and Southwest Regions.

Regional headquarters are located in Waco, Texas.

The Southwest Region is made up of eight districts in seven states.

 (Split into two districts, "East" and "West")

Regional championship in the Gulf States

In 2001, the region was briefly called the Gulf States region.  Alabama and Tennessee competed in this region before joining the Southeast Region the following year.  The table below lists the participants in the 2001 tournament, with the winner indicated in green.

Regional championship in the Southwest

In 2002, the region was renamed the Southwest Region.  Colorado and New Mexico joined the region to replace Alabama and Tennessee.  Additionally, Texas was split into two districts, giving the Southwest region eight teams.  The list below lists each state's participant in the Southwest Little League Region Tournament. That year's winner is indicated in green.

LLWS results
As of the 2022 Little League World Series.

Results by state
As of the 2022 Little League World Series.

External links
Official site

Southwest
Baseball competitions in the United States
Sports in the Southern United States